Pretty Scary Silver Fairy is the second studio album by Norwegian recording artist Margaret Berger. It was released in Norway on 2 October 2006 by RCA Records. Its title comes from Berger's wish for the album to be "sweet but mean at the same time". The lyrics were written by Berger and inspired by her adolescence.

Track listing

Notes
 "Silver Fairy" contains elements of "Holiday in Harlem" written by Nathaniel Reed and Chick Webb.
 "Naive (16)" contains elements of "Gentle on My Mind" written by John Hartford.

Personnel
Credits adapted from the liner notes of Pretty Scary Silver Fairy.

 Margaret Berger – lead vocals (all tracks); backing vocals (1–4, 6–10)
 Joakim Bachmann – live drums (6)
 Liah Cheston – mastering
 Illi – backing vocals (5)
 Jukka Immonen – engineering, mixing, production (3–6, 8, 10); backing vocals (5)
 Krzysztof – additional strings arrangement
 Pete "Boxsta" Martin – drum programming, engineering, keyboard programming, mixing, production (1, 2, 7, 9)
 Henry Parsley – additional Pro Tools editing (1)
 Patric Sarin – additional vocals (8)
 Hans Jørgen Støp – lead synth (10)

Charts

References

2006 albums
Margaret Berger albums
RCA Records albums